Ewa Barbara Sowińska (born 5 March 1944 in Bydgoszcz) is a Polish politician. She was elected to the Sejm on 25 September 2005, getting 8536 votes in 9 Łódź district, on the League of Polish Families party list.

She became Ombudsman for Children in 2006. On 22 April 2008 she resigned from the position, effective 30 June 2008.

She was also a member of the Sejm 2001–2005. She was trained in internal medicine at the Medical University of Białystok.

In the past, she has suggested that homosexuals should be banned from certain professions and forced to register with the government, that unmarried cohabiting couples be required to register with the state, and planned to order an investigation for supposed homosexuality in the British children's television series Teletubbies.

See also 
 Members of Polish Sejm 2005-2007

References

External links 
 Ewa Sowińska - parliamentary page - includes declarations of interest, voting record, and transcripts of speeches.

1944 births
Living people
Politicians from Bydgoszcz
Members of the Polish Sejm 2005–2007
Members of the Polish Sejm 2001–2005
Women members of the Sejm of the Republic of Poland
Ombudsmen in Poland
Children's Ombudsmen
League of Polish Families politicians
Polish United Workers' Party members
21st-century Polish women politicians
20th-century Polish women